Jehangir Hospital is a 350-bed hospital in Pune, Maharashtra, India. Sir Cowasji Jehangir and Lady Hirabai Jehangir founded the hospital on 6 February 1946.

History 
The Jehangir Nursing Home was set by Sir Cowasji and Lady Hirabai who donated the land to start the hospital. The villa was called Ready Money Villa but they named it after their son Jehangir, who died that year. The hospital began with 8 beds and Eduljee H Coyaji was asked to helm Pune city's first private hospital in May 1946.

Facilities 
Jehangir Hospital has 350 beds. It has been certified by NABH in 2013 and NABL. It works closely with the Hirabai Cowasji Jehangir Medical Research Institute and the National Aids Research Institute. It handles around 1,00,000 patients annually including international patients who come from countries that include the Middle East and Africa.

Acquisitions 
In 2017, Jehangir Hospital acquired the Jog Hospital in Kothrud, a suburb in Pune and have renamed it as Jehangir Specialty Hospital.

References

Hospital buildings completed in 1946
Hospitals in Pune
Hospitals established in 1946
1946 establishments in India
20th-century architecture in India